Moonglow may refer to:

Music
 Moonglow (Avantasia album), 2019
 Moonglow, an album by Bucky Pizzarelli and Frank Vignola, 2005
 Moonglow (Pat Boone album), 1960
 Moonglow (Tatsuro Yamashita album), 1979
 "Moonglow", a song from Moonglow/This Bitter Earth by Venetian Snares, 2004
 "Moonglow" (song), by Will Hudson and Irving Mills, 1933
 "The Theme for Moonglow", a 2008 song by Windsor Airlift, originally by Dolphin Park
 The Moonglows, an American R&B and doo-wop group
 Moonglow Records, an American record label

Other
 Moonlight, mostly sunlight reflected from the parts of the Moon's surface
 Moonglow (comics), a fictional character in the Marvel Comics universe
 Moonglow (novel), a 2016 novel by Michael Chabon